A biosignature (sometimes called chemical fossil or molecular fossil) is any substance – such as an element, isotope, or molecule – or phenomenon that provides scientific evidence of past or present life. Measurable attributes of life include its complex physical or chemical structures and its use of free energy and the production of biomass and wastes. A biosignature can provide evidence for living organisms outside the Earth and can be directly or indirectly detected by searching for their unique byproducts.

Types 
In general, biosignatures can be grouped into ten broad categories:

Isotope patterns: Isotopic evidence or patterns that require biological processes.
Chemistry: Chemical features that require biological activity.
Organic matter: Organics formed by biological processes.
Minerals: Minerals or biomineral-phases whose composition and/or morphology indicate biological activity (e.g., biomagnetite).
Microscopic structures and textures: Biologically formed cements, microtextures, microfossils, and films.
Macroscopic physical structures and textures: Structures that indicate microbial ecosystems, biofilms (e.g., stromatolites), or fossils of larger organisms.
Temporal variability: Variations in time of atmospheric gases, reflectivity, or macroscopic appearance that indicate the presence of life.
Surface reflectance features: Large-scale reflectance features due to biological pigments, which could be detected remotely.
Atmospheric gases: Gases formed by metabolic and/or aqueous processes, which may be present on a planet-wide scale.
Technosignatures: Signatures that indicate a technologically advanced civilization.

Viability 
Determining if a potential biosignature is worth being investigated is a fundamentally complicated process. Scientists must consider any and every possible alternate explanation before concluding that something is a true biosignature. This includes investigating the minute details that make other planets unique and being able to understand when there is a deviation from the expected non-biological processes present on a planet. In the case of a planet with life, it is possible that these differences can be extremely small or not present at all, adding to the difficulties of discovering a biosignature. Years of scientific studies have culminated in three criteria that a potential biosignature must meet in order to be considered viable for further research: Reliability, survivability, and detectability.

Reliability 
A biosignature must be able to dominate over all other processes that may produce similar physical, spectral, and chemical features. When investigating a potential biosignature, scientists must be careful to consider all other possible origins of the biosignature in question. There are many forms of life that are known to mimic geochemical reactions. In fact, one of the theories on the origin of life involves molecules figuring out how to catalyze geochemical reactions to exploit the energy being released by them. These are some of the earliest known metabolisms (see methanogenesis). In a case such as this, scientists might search for a disequilibrium in the geochemical cycle, which would point to a reaction happening more or less often than it should. A disequilibrium such as this could be interpreted as an indication of life.

Survivability 
A biosignature must be able to last for long enough so that a probe, telescope, or human can be able to detect it. A consequence of a biological organism's use of metabolic reactions for energy is the production of metabolic waste. In addition, the structure of an organism can be preserved as a fossil and we know that some fossils on Earth are as old as 3.5 billion years. These byproducts can make excellent biosignatures since they provide direct evidence for life. However, in order to be a viable biosignature, a byproduct must subsequently remain intact so that scientists may discover it.

Detectability 
For a biosignature to be relevant in the context of scientific investigation, it must be detectable with the technology currently available. This seems to be an obvious statement, however there are many scenarios in which life may be present on a planet, yet remain undetectable because of human-caused limitations.

False positives 
Every possible biosignature is associated with its own set of unique false positive mechanisms, or non-biological processes that can mimic the detectable feature of a biosignature. An important example of this is using oxygen as a biosignature. On Earth, the majority of life is centered around oxygen. It is a byproduct of photosynthesis and it is subsequently used by other forms of life to breathe. Oxygen is also readily detectable in spectra, with multiple bands across a relatively wide wavelength range, therefore it makes a very good biosignature. However, finding oxygen alone in a planet's atmosphere is not enough to confirm a biosignature because of the false-positive mechanisms associated with it. One possibility is that oxygen can build up abiotically via photolysis if there is a low inventory of non-condensible gasses or if it loses a lot of water. Finding and distinguishing a biosignature from its potential false-positive mechanisms is one of the most complicated parts of testing for viability because it relies on human ingenuity to break an abiotic-biological degeneracy, if nature allows.

False negatives 
Opposite to false positives, false negative biosignatures arise in a scenario where life may be present on another planet, but there are some processes on that planet that make potential biosignatures undetectable. This is an ongoing problem and area of research in the preparation for future telescopes that will be capable of observing exoplanetary atmospheres.

Human limitations 
There are many ways in which humans may limit the viability of a potential biosignature. The resolution of a telescope becomes important when vetting certain false-positive mechanisms, and many current telescopes do not have the capabilities to observe at the resolution needed to investigate some of these. In addition, probes and telescopes are worked on by huge collaborations of scientists with varying interests. As a result, new probes and telescopes carry a variety of instruments that are compromises to everyone's unique inputs. In order for a different type of scientist to be able to detect something not related to biosignatures, a sacrifice may have to be made in the capability of an instrument to search for biosignatures.

Examples

Geomicrobiology 

The ancient record on Earth provides an opportunity to see what geochemical signatures are produced by microbial life and how these signatures are preserved over geologic time. Some related disciplines such as geochemistry, geobiology, and geomicrobiology often use biosignatures to determine if living organisms are or were present in a sample. These possible biosignatures include: (a) microfossils and stromatolites; (b) molecular structures (biomarkers) and isotopic compositions of carbon, nitrogen and hydrogen in organic matter; (c) multiple sulfur and oxygen isotope ratios of minerals; and (d) abundance relationships and isotopic compositions of redox sensitive metals (e.g., Fe, Mo, Cr, and rare earth elements).

For example, the particular fatty acids measured in a sample can indicate which types of bacteria and archaea live in that environment. Another example are the long-chain fatty alcohols with more than 23 atoms that are produced by planktonic bacteria. When used in this sense, geochemists often prefer the term biomarker. Another example is the presence of straight-chain lipids in the form of alkanes, alcohols and fatty acids with 20-36 carbon atoms in soils or sediments. Peat deposits are an indication of originating from the epicuticular wax of higher plants.

Life processes may produce a range of biosignatures such as nucleic acids, lipids, proteins, amino acids, kerogen-like material and various morphological features that are detectable in rocks and sediments.
Microbes often interact with geochemical processes, leaving features in the rock record indicative of biosignatures. For example, bacterial micrometer-sized pores in carbonate rocks resemble inclusions under transmitted light, but have distinct size, shapes and patterns (swirling or dendritic) and are distributed differently from common fluid inclusions.  A potential biosignature is a phenomenon that may have been produced by life, but for which alternate abiotic origins may also be possible.

Morphology

Another possible biosignature might be morphology since the shape and size of certain objects may potentially indicate the presence of past or present life. For example, microscopic magnetite crystals in the Martian meteorite ALH84001 are one of the longest-debated of several potential biosignatures in that specimen. The possible biomineral studied in the Martian ALH84001 meteorite includes putative microbial fossils, tiny rock-like structures whose shape was a potential biosignature because it resembled known bacteria. Most scientists ultimately concluded that these were far too small to be fossilized cells. A consensus that has emerged from these discussions, and is now seen as a critical requirement, is the demand for further lines of evidence in addition to any morphological data that supports such extraordinary claims. Currently, the scientific consensus is that "morphology alone cannot be used unambiguously as a tool for primitive life detection." Interpretation of morphology is notoriously subjective, and its use alone has led to numerous errors of interpretation.

Chemical

No single compound will prove life once existed. Rather, it will be distinctive patterns present in any organic compounds showing a process of selection. For example, membrane lipids left behind by degraded cells will be concentrated, have a limited size range, and comprise an even number of carbons. Similarly, life only uses left-handed amino acids. Biosignatures need not be chemical, however, and can also be suggested by a distinctive magnetic biosignature.

On Mars, surface oxidants and UV radiation will have altered or destroyed organic molecules at or near the surface. One issue that may add ambiguity in such a search is the fact that, throughout Martian history, abiogenic organic-rich chondritic meteorites have undoubtedly rained upon the Martian surface. At the same time, strong oxidants in Martian soil along with exposure to ionizing radiation might alter or destroy molecular signatures from meteorites or organisms. An alternative approach would be to seek concentrations of buried crystalline minerals, such as clays and evaporites, which may protect organic matter from the destructive effects of ionizing radiation and strong oxidants. The search for Martian biosignatures has become
more promising due to the discovery that surface and near-surface aqueous environments existed on Mars at the same time when biological organic matter was being preserved in ancient aqueous sediments on Earth.

Atmospheric 
The atmospheric properties of exoplanets are of particular importance, as atmospheres provide the most likely observables for the near future, including habitability indicators and biosignatures. Over billions of years, the processes of life on a planet would result in a mixture of chemicals unlike anything that could form in an ordinary chemical equilibrium.  For example, large amounts of oxygen and small amounts of methane are generated by life on Earth.

An exoplanet's color—or reflectance spectrum—can also be used as a biosignature due to the effect of pigments that are uniquely biologic in origin such as the pigments of phototrophic and photosynthetic life forms. Scientists use the Earth as an example of this when looked at from far away (see Pale Blue Dot) as a comparison to worlds observed outside of our solar system. Ultraviolet radiation on life forms could also induce biofluorescence in visible wavelengths that may be detected by the new generation of space observatories under development.

Some scientists have reported methods of detecting hydrogen and methane in extraterrestrial atmospheres.  Habitability indicators and biosignatures must be interpreted within a planetary and environmental context. For example, the presence of oxygen and methane together could indicate the kind of extreme thermochemical disequilibrium generated by life. Two of the top 14,000 proposed atmospheric biosignatures are dimethyl sulfide and chloromethane.  An alternative biosignature is the combination of methane and carbon dioxide.

The detection of phosphine in the atmosphere of Venus is being investigated as a possible biosignature.

Methane on Mars 

The presence of methane in the atmosphere of Mars is an area of ongoing research and a highly contentious subject. Because of its tendency to be destroyed in the atmosphere by photochemistry, the presence of excess methane on a planet can be an indication that there must be an active source. With life being the strongest source of methane on Earth, observing a disequilibrium in the methane abundance on another planet could be a viable biosignature.

Since 2004, there have been several detections of methane in the Mars atmosphere by a variety of instruments onboard orbiters and ground-based landers on the Martian surface as well as Earth-based telescopes. These missions reported values anywhere between a 'background level' ranging between 0.24 and 0.65 parts per billion by volume (p.p.b.v.) to as much as 45 ± 10 p.p.b.v.

However, recent measurements using the ACS and NOMAD instruments on board the ESA-Roscosmos ExoMars Trace Gas Orbiter have failed to detect any methane over a range of latitudes and longitudes on both Martian hemispheres. These highly sensitive instruments were able to put an upper bound on the overall methane abundance at 0.05 p.p.b.v. This nondetection is a major contradiction to what was previously observed with less sensitive instruments and will remain a strong argument in the ongoing debate over the presence of methane in the Martian atmosphere.

Furthermore, current photochemical models cannot explain the presence of methane in the atmosphere of Mars and its reported rapid variations in space and time. Neither its fast appearance nor disappearance can be explained yet. To rule out a biogenic origin for the methane, a future probe or lander hosting a mass spectrometer will be needed, as the isotopic proportions of carbon-12 to carbon-14 in methane could distinguish between a biogenic and non-biogenic origin, similarly to the use of the δ13C standard for recognizing biogenic methane on Earth.

Atmospheric disequilibrium 

A disequilibrium in the abundances of gas species in an atmosphere can be interpreted as a biosignature. On Earth, life has greatly altered the atmosphere in a way that would be unlikely for any other processes to replicate. Therefore, a departure from equilibrium is evidence for a biosignature. For example, the abundance of methane in the Earth's atmosphere is orders of magnitude above the equilibrium value due to the constant methane flux that life on the surface emits. Depending on the host star, a disequilibrium in the methane abundance on another planet may indicate a biosignature.

Agnostic biosignatures 
Because the only form of known life is that on Earth, the search for biosignatures is heavily influenced by the products that life produces on Earth. However, life that is different than life on Earth may still produce biosignatures that are detectable by humans, even though nothing is known about their specific biology. This form of biosignature is called an "agnostic biosignature" because it is independent of the form of life that produces it. It is widely agreed that all life–no matter how different it is from life on Earth–needs a source of energy to thrive. This must involve some sort of chemical disequilibrium, which can be exploited for metabolism. Geological processes are independent of life, and if scientists are able to constrain the geology well enough on another planet, then they know what the particular geologic equilibrium for that planet should be. A deviation from geological equilibrium can be interpreted as both an atmospheric disequilibrium and agnostic biosignature.

Antibiosignatures 
In the same way that detecting a biosignature would be an incredibly important discovery about a planet, finding evidence that life is not present can be an important discovery about a planet as well. Life relies on redox imbalances to metabolize the resources available into energy. The evidence that nothing on a planet is taking advantage of the "free lunch" available due to an observed redox imbalance is called antibiosignatures.

Martian atmosphere 
The Martian atmosphere contains high abundances of photochemically produced CO and H2, which are reducing molecules. Mars' atmosphere is otherwise mostly oxidizing, leading to a source of untapped energy that life could exploit if it used a metabolism compatible with one or both of these reducing molecules. Because these molecules can be observed, scientists use this as evidence for an antibiosignature. Scientists have used this concept as an argument against life on Mars.

Missions inside the Solar System 
Astrobiological exploration is founded upon the premise that biosignatures encountered in space will be recognizable as extraterrestrial life. The usefulness of a biosignature is determined not only by the probability of life creating it but also by the improbability of non-biological (abiotic) processes producing it. Concluding that evidence of an extraterrestrial life form (past or present) has been discovered requires proving that a possible biosignature was produced by the activities or remains of life. As with most scientific discoveries, discovery of a biosignature will require evidence building up until no other explanation exists.

Possible examples of a biosignature include complex organic molecules or structures whose formation is virtually unachievable in the absence of life:

 Cellular and extracellular morphologies
 Biomolecules in rocks
 Bio-organic molecular structures
 Chirality
 Biogenic minerals
 Biogenic isotope patterns in minerals and organic compounds
 Atmospheric gases
 Photosynthetic pigments

The Viking missions to Mars 

The Viking missions to Mars in the 1970s conducted the first experiments which were explicitly designed to look for biosignatures on another planet.  Each of the two Viking landers carried three life-detection experiments which looked for signs of metabolism; however, the results were declared inconclusive.

Mars Science Laboratory 

The Curiosity rover from the Mars Science Laboratory mission, with its Curiosity rover is currently assessing the potential past and present habitability of the Martian environment and is attempting to detect biosignatures on the surface of Mars. Considering the MSL instrument payload package, the following classes of biosignatures are within the MSL detection window: organism morphologies (cells, body fossils, casts), biofabrics (including microbial mats), diagnostic organic molecules, isotopic signatures, evidence of biomineralization and bioalteration, spatial patterns in chemistry, and biogenic gases.  The Curiosity rover targets outcrops to maximize the probability of detecting 'fossilized' organic matter preserved in sedimentary deposits.

ExoMars Orbiter 
The 2016 ExoMars Trace Gas Orbiter (TGO) is a Mars telecommunications orbiter and atmospheric gas analyzer mission. It delivered the Schiaparelli EDM lander and then began to settle into its science orbit to map the sources of methane on Mars and other gases, and in doing so, will help select the landing site for the Rosalind Franklin rover to be launched in 2022.

Mars 2020 Rover 
The Mars 2020 rover, which launched in 2020, is intended to investigate an astrobiologically relevant ancient environment on Mars, investigate its surface geological processes and history, including the assessment of its past habitability, the possibility of past life on Mars, and potential for preservation of biosignatures within accessible geological materials. In addition, it will cache the most interesting samples for possible future transport to Earth.

Titan Dragonfly 
NASA's Dragonfly lander/aircraft concept is proposed to launch in 2025 and would seek evidence of biosignatures on the organic-rich surface and atmosphere of Titan, as well as study its possible prebiotic primordial soup. Titan is the largest moon of Saturn and is widely believed to have a large subsurface ocean consisting of a salty brine. In addition, scientists believe that Titan may have the conditions necessary to promote prebiotic chemistry, making it a prime candidate for biosignature discovery.

Europa Clipper 

NASA's Europa Clipper probe is designed as a flyby mission to Jupiter's smallest Galilean moon, Europa. Set to launch in 2024, this probe will investigate the potential for habitability on Europa. Europa is one of the best candidates for biosignature discovery in the Solar System because of the scientific consensus that it retains a subsurface ocean, with two to three times the volume of water on Earth. Evidence for this subsurface ocean includes:

Voyager 1 (1979): The first close-up photos of Europa are taken. Scientists propose that the tectonic-like marks on the surface could be caused by a subsurface ocean.
Galileo (1997): The magnetometer aboard this probe detected a subtle change in the magnetic field near Europa. This was later interpreted as a disruption in the expected magnetic field due to the induction of current in a conducting layer on Europa. The composition of this conducting layer is consistent with a salty subsurface ocean.
Hubble Space Telescope (2012): An image was taken of Europa which showed evidence for a plume of water vapor coming off the surface.

The Europa Clipper probe will carry instruments to help confirm the existence and composition of a subsurface ocean and thick icy layer. In addition, it will map the surface to study features that may point to tectonic activity due to a subsurface ocean.

Enceladus 

Although there are no set plans to search for biosignatures on Saturn's sixth-largest moon, Enceladus, the prospects of biosignature discovery there are exciting enough to warrant several mission concepts that may be funded in the future. Similar to Jupiter's moon Europa, there is much evidence for a subsurface ocean to exist on Enceladus as well. Plumes of water vapor were first observed in 2005 by the Cassini mission and were later determined to contain salt as well as organic compounds. In 2014, more evidence was presented using gravimetric measurements on Enceladus to conclude that there is in fact a large reservoir of water underneath an icy surface. Mission design concepts include:

Enceladus Life Finder (ELF)
Enceladus Life Signatures and Habitability
 Enceladus Organic Analyzer
 Enceladus Explorer (En-Ex)
 Explorer of Enceladus and Titan (E2T)
 Journey to Enceladus and Titan (JET)
 Life Investigation For Enceladus (LIFE)
 Testing the Habitability of Enceladus's Ocean (THEO)

All of these concept missions have similar science goals: To assess the habitability of Enceladus and search for biosignatures, in line with the strategic map for exploring the ocean-world Enceladus.

Searching outside of the Solar System 
At 4.2 light-years (1.3 parsecs, 40 trillion km, or 25 trillion miles) away from Earth, the closest potentially habitable exoplanet is Proxima Centauri b, which was discovered in 2016. This means it would take more than 18,100 years to get there if a vessel could consistently travel as fast as the Juno spacecraft (250,000 kilometers per hour or 150,000 miles per hour). It is currently not feasible to send humans or even probes to search for biosignatures outside of the Solar System. The only way to search for biosignatures outside of the Solar System is by observing exoplanets with telescopes.

There have been no plausible or confirmed biosignature detections outside of the Solar System. Despite this, it is a rapidly growing field of research due to the prospects of the next generation of telescopes. The James Webb Space Telescope, which launched in December 2021, will be a promising next step in the search for biosignatures. Although its wavelength range and resolution will not be compatible with some of the more important atmospheric biosignature gas bands like oxygen, it will still be able to detect some evidence for oxygen false positive mechanisms.

The new generation of ground-based 30-meter class telescopes (Thirty Meter Telescope and Extremely Large Telescope) will have the ability to take high-resolution spectra of exoplanet atmospheres at a variety of wavelengths. These telescopes will be capable of distinguishing some of the more difficult false positive mechanisms such as the abiotic buildup of oxygen via photolysis. In addition, their large collecting area will enable high angular resolution, making direct imaging studies more feasible.

See also 
 Bioindicator
 MERMOZ (remote detection of lifeforms)
 Taphonomy
 Technosignature

References 

Astrobiology
Astrochemistry
Bioindicators
Biology terminology
Search for extraterrestrial intelligence